Baby Woman (stylized as babywoman) is the debut studio album by English fashion model Naomi Campbell, released on 3 October 1994, by Epic Records. The album is her only full-length music release. Campbell collaborated with a number of producers and songwriters, including Gavin Friday, Tim Simenon, Youth, Justin Strauss, Bruce Roberts and P.M. Dawn. Musically, Baby Woman is an R&B album that also fuses different genres, such as house, trip hop and country.

Upon its release, the album received generally mixed reviews from music critics and was a commercial failure in the United Kingdom, where it did not chart UK Albums Chart. However, the album was a success in Japan and sold over one million copies worldwide. Two singles were released from the album: "Love & Tears", which reached number 40 on the UK Singles Chart, and "I Want to Live".

Track listing

Singles 
"Love and Tears" is the only song from the album to have a video. The video was directed by Anton Corbijn. The single reached number 40 in the UK and the top 10 in Italy.

Charts

References

1994 debut albums
Albums produced by Tim Simenon
Albums produced by Youth (musician)
Epic Records albums
Naomi Campbell albums